Gusztáv Szerémi (also Gustave Szerémi, Gustav Szerémi; 9 May 1877 in Budapest – 16 August 1952 in Budapest) was a Hungarian violinist, violist and composer.

Szerémi was professor of violin and viola at the Royal National Hungarian Academy of Music (Országos Magyar Királyi Zeneakadémia, now the Franz Liszt Academy of Music) in Budapest around the turn of the 20th century.  His pedagogical works for viola were introduced as the official curriculum of the Academy.

Selected works
Concertante
 Concerto No. 1 in F major for viola (viola alto) and orchestra, Op. 6 (published 1890s)
 Concerto No. 2 in g minor for viola (viola alto) and orchestra, Op. 57 (1911)
 Concertino No. 1 in G major for violin and orchestra, Op. 63
 Concertino No. 2 in E minor for violin and orchestra, Op. 64
 Concertino No. 3 in D major for violin and orchestra, Op. 65

Chamber music
 Rêverie for viola (viola alto) and piano, Op. 2
 Souvenir, Morceau de salon for violin and piano, Op. 3
 Rêverie in F major for violin and piano, Op. 5
 Öt előadást képző könnyü hegedűdarab (5 Easy Concert Pieces in Positions I–V; 5 Leichte Vortragstücke von I. bis V. Lage) for violin and piano, Op. 5
     Gyermekjelenet (Kinderscene)
     Barcarolle
     Valse
     Romance (Romanze)
     Marcia
 Trois morceaux lyriques (3 Lyric Pieces) for viola (viola alto) and piano, Op. 33
     Souvenir in B major
     Chanson triste in E minor
     Prière in E major
 Scherzo in A minor for 3 violins, Op. 51
 Cinq amusements pour les jeunes artistes de violon (5 Recreations for Young Artists of the Violin), Op. 58
     Menuetto in B major
     Berceuse in G minor
     Scherzo in E major
     Gavotte in A major
     Marcia in E major
 Mélodie, Morceau de salon (Salon Piece) for cello and piano, Op. 61

Pedagogical
 12 fokozatos tanulmány a technika fejlesztésére (12 Technical Studies; Zwölf technische Studien) for violin and piano, Op. 12
 24 fokozatos tanulmány a technika fejlesztésére (24 Progressive Studies; 24 Études progressives) for viola, Op. 56
     Volume 1 (Nos.1–12): Positions I through III
     Volume 2 (Nos.13–24): Positions I through V
 Eleméleti és gyakorlati mélyhegedű-iskola (Elementary and Practical Viola Method)
 Eleméleti és gyakorlati uj nagy brácsaiskola (Elementary and Practical New High Viola Method)
 A mélyhegedűjáték főiskolája, Kamarazene-tanulmányok régibb és modern mesterek műveiből, 2 kötetben, Az akadémiai osztályok használatára (The High School of Viola Playing)
     I. kötet: Haydn–Volkmann (Volume 1: From Haydn to Volkmann)
     II. kötet: Bruckner–től napjainkig (Volume 2: From Bruckner Onward)

Sources
 Rozsnyai Károly könyv-és zeneműkiadóhivatala (Károly Rozsnyai Book and Music Publisher), Budapest

External links
 

1877 births
1952 deaths
Hungarian composers
Hungarian male composers
Hungarian classical violinists
Male classical violinists
Hungarian classical violists
Academic staff of the Franz Liszt Academy of Music